The 1969–70 season was Galatasaray's 66th in existence and the 12th consecutive season in the 1. Lig. This article shows statistics of the club's players in the season, and also lists all matches that the club have played in the season.

Squad statistics

Players in / out

In

Out

1.Lig

Standings

Matches

Türkiye Kupası
Kick-off listed in local time (EET)

1st round

2nd round

1/4 Final

European Cup

First round

Second round

1/4 final

Friendly Matches

Metin Oktay Testimonial match

TSYD Kupası

Attendance

References

 Tuncay, Bülent (2002). Galatasaray Tarihi. Yapı Kredi Yayınları

External links
 Galatasaray Sports Club Official Website 
 Turkish Football Federation – Galatasaray A.Ş. 
 uefa.com – Galatasaray AŞ

Galatasaray S.K. (football) seasons
Turkish football clubs 1969–70 season
1960s in Istanbul
1970s in Istanbul